Amplify is a curriculum and assessment company launched in July 2012. Amplify Curriculum was built on the foundation of Wireless Generation, the educational company News Corp bought in 2010. Amplify products and services provide assessment and analytics for data-driven instruction and next-generation digital curriculum based on the Common Core State Standards.

News Corp sold Amplify in 2015 for an undisclosed sum to the Emerson Collective, a philanthropic organization founded by Laurene Powell Jobs. Larry Berger, co-founder of Wireless Generation, is now the chief executive of the new company.

Company overview 
Amplify was formed after the purchase of Wireless Generation, which was founded in 2000 by Larry Berger and Greg Gunn. The company sold its products and services to districts and states that used government funding for early reading and other programs. It also developed and maintained the New York City online warehouse of student data ARIS, and wrote the algorithm for the School of One, the New York City Department of Education's math help system. Larry Berger served as the CEO of Wireless Generation until the sale of the company in 2010. At the time of the sale, the users of Wireless Generation software included three million students and 200,000 educators.

In November 2010 a 90% stake in Wireless Generation was purchased by News Corp for $360 million. News Corp changed the name of its subsidiary in 2012 to Amplify. Following the acquisition, News Corp invested about half a billion dollars into the company in order to expand its offerings to devices and digital curriculum, designed to replace hard copy textbooks, and to decrease the price-point gap between traditional textbooks and tablet-based education.

Joel Klein, former chancellor for the New York City Department of Education and an executive vice-president with News Corp served as Amplify's CEO until 2015. During his time as CEO, Klein stated that the goal of Amplify is to encourage the integration of computer technology into the common educational environment, rather than a separate learning environment such as a laboratory.

Since 2015, Amplify has found success with its curriculum and assessment offerings. Its 2018 revenue was $125 million and it now serves nearly 4 million students.  Its science program has been adopted by several large urban districts, including Chicago, New York, Denver, and Los Angeles, and has 950,000 users.

Assessment
Amplify provides assessment tools for K-12 schools. Tools are available for Math and ELA, Pre-K to 8th Grade. Amplify also provides secure data hosting, reporting and management for educational institutions. Smarter Balanced Assessment Consortium signed a contract with Amplify to create a digital library of formative assessment professional learning tools designed for Common Core State Standards teachers. Amplify also signed a contract with Smarter Balanced before its purchase by News Corp to develop reporting tools for teacher assessment. The library provides online access to teachers for formative test items, and assessment tools. Amplify's software uses data analysis to plan teaching tactics and track educational results. This has included the provision of data coaches to teachers in Delaware.

Curriculum
Amplify provides print, digital, and blended core curriculum for ELA and science. ELA curricula are based upon the Common Core State Standards and the science curriculum is aligned to the Next Generation Science Standards. The science program was developed in partnership with the Lawrence Hall of Science at the University of California Berkeley.  In each lesson, students take on the role of a scientist or engineer.  The lessons focus on natural phenomena and the application of concepts to real-world problems.

The Amplify ELA curriculum also includes educational games that can be played by students in and outside of class time, and a library of 300 pre-loaded books.

In 2018, Amplify announced that it entered the digital supplemental market with two programs:  Amplify Close Reading and Amplify Fractions. Amplify has since retired the fractions product. 

In May 2022, Amplify acquired the Desmos curriculum and teacher.desmos.com. Some 50 employees joined Amplify. Desmos Studio was spun off as a separate public benefit corporation focused on building calculator products and other math tools.

Ostrilope
The Ostrilope is a fictional creature created by Amplify as a part of their Natural Selection unit. It is modeled after an ostrich, with some differences, notably their lack of wings, and fur instead of feathers. The Ostrilope is used in many lessons regarding natural selection, usually to observe how species change.

Thornpalm
As for plants, the thornpalm is a fictional species of plant created . The Thornpalm's closest correlation resembles a Yucca brevifolia also known as a Joshua Tree. The Thornpalm is used in many lessons regarding natural selection, usually as a food source to the Ostrilope. In Amplify's provided curriculum, the Thornpalm's height can often be changed by the user, as well as the size of its thorns and its water storage capabilities.

Tablet

In March 2013, Amplify released the Amplify Tablet, a customized Asus Android tablet with a suite of subscription-based software, offering education-oriented features and apps designed for K-12 learning environments. In March 2014, the company released a new version of the Amplify Tablet designed by Intel. In 2015, Amplify announced it would cease marketing the tablet to new customers but would continue to service its existing customers. Amplify is no longer in the hardware business.  Since 2015, its focus has been exclusively on curriculum and assessment.

References

External links
 
 News Corp. Education Tablet: For The Love Of Learning?, David Folkenflik, March 8, 2013

2012 establishments in New York City
Educational technology companies of the United States
Former News Corporation subsidiaries
2000 establishments in New York City
Companies based in Brooklyn